A paifang, also known as a pailou, is a traditional style of Chinese architectural arch or gateway structure.

Etymology
The word paifang was originally a collective term for the top two levels of administrative division and subdivisions of ancient Chinese cities. The largest division within a city in ancient China was a fang, equivalent to a current day ward. Each fang was enclosed by walls or fences, and the gates of these enclosures were shut and guarded every night. Each fang was further divided into several pai, which is equivalent to a current day (unincorporated) community. Each pai, in turn, contained an area including several hutongs (alleyways).

This system of urban administrative division and subdivision reached an elaborate level during the Tang dynasty, and continued in the following dynasties. For example, during the Ming dynasty, Beijing was divided into a total of 36 fangs. Originally, the word paifang referred to the gate of a fang and the marker for an entrance of a building complex or a town; but by the Song dynasty, a paifang had evolved into a purely decorative monument.

History

During the Tang dynasty, it was called a wutoumen, because the top of the two posts were painted black. A wutoumen was reserved for officials of rank 6 or higher.

The construction of wutomen was standardized in the Yingzao Fashi of the mid Song dynasty. It consisted of two posts and a horizontal beam forming a frame and two doors. By the Ming and Qing dynasties, it was called a pailou or paifang, and evolved into a more elaborate structure with more posts and gates, with a superstructural gable on top; the highest rank was a five gate-six post-eleven gable pailou.

It has been theorized that the paifang gate architecture was influenced by Buddhist torana temple gates. Paifang have traditional Chinese architectural characteristics such as multi-tiered roofs, various supporting posts, and archway-shapes of traditional gates and towers.

Style
Paifang come in a number of forms. One form involves placing wooden pillars onto stone bases, which are bound together with wooden beams. This type of paifang is always beautifully decorated, with the pillars usually painted in red, the beams decorated with intricate designs and Chinese calligraphy, and the roof covered with coloured tiles, complete with mythical beasts—just like a Chinese palace. Another form of paifang is in the form of true archways made of stone or bricks; the walls may be painted, or decorated with coloured tiles; the top of the archways is decorated like their wooden counterparts. Yet another form of paifang, built mainly on religious and burial grounds, consists of plain white stone pillars and beams, with neither roof tiles nor any coloured decoration, but feature elaborate carvings created by master masons. Another form is in the Han dynasty style, and is two matching towers, such as in Beihai.

Outside of China, the paifang has long been the symbol of Chinatowns. The first paifang in the United States was raised in 1915 as a temporary installation for the Chinese pavilion of the Panama–Pacific International Exposition in San Francisco, and the oldest still standing was erected in 1938 for Los Angeles, Chinatown West Gate on Hill Street; it was listed as a city Historic-Cultural Monument (#825) along with its counterpart, Chinatown East Gate (1939, #826) in November 2005. The paifang at the entrance to Ottawa's Chinatown was decorated by Chinese artists using Chinese materials and techniques. 

In the past, "Chastity Paifang" were given to widows who remained unmarried till death, praising what was seen as loyalty to their deceased husbands.

Gallery

Chinese paifang

See also
 Chinatown gate
 Shanmen, gate of Chinese Buddhist temple 
 Hongsalmun, in Korean architecture with both religious and other usage 
 Iljumun, portal in Korean Buddhist temple architecture
 Tam quan, a Vietnamese style of traditional gateway
 Torana, a Hindu-Buddhist ceremonial arched gateway
 Torii, in Japanese Shinto shrine architecture

References

External links 
 

Types of gates
Chinese words and phrases
Architecture in China